Linwood C. "King" Bailey (November 1870 – November 19, 1917) was a baseball pitcher for the Cincinnati Reds. Born in Virginia, he died in Macon, Georgia. He played only one entire baseball game for the Cincinnati Reds during his career, which he won, on September 21, 1895. He batted and threw left-handed.

External links

Major League Baseball pitchers
Cincinnati Reds players
Baseball players from Virginia
1870 births
1917 deaths
19th-century baseball players
Minor league baseball managers
Jamestown (minor league baseball) players
Rockford Hustlers players
Macon Central City players
New Orleans Pelicans (baseball) players
Nashville Tigers players
Richmond Crows players
Grand Rapids Rippers players
Staunton Hayseeds players
Newport News-Hampton Deckhands players
Montgomery Grays players
Montgomery Senators players
Richmond Bluebirds players
Paris Midlands players
Evansville Brewers players
Augusta (minor league baseball) players
Dallas Steers players
Albany Senators players
Columbia (Tennessee–Alabama League) players
Nashville Vols players